Lauchringen is a village in the district of Waldshut in Baden-Württemberg in Germany. It is divided in two districts: Oberlauchringen and Unterlauchringen.

Geography 
Lauchringen lies on the Rhine Plain in the lower Klettgau at the foot of the Küssaberg with its castle of Küssaburg, one of the landmarks of the region.

References

External links

  

Waldshut (district)
Baden